The Taipei Metro Huilong station is a station on the Xinzhuang Line located in Xinzhuang, New Taipei City, and Guishan District, Taoyuan City, Taiwan. It is the western terminus of the Xinzhuang Line and opened on Jun 29, 2013. It will be a terminus on the Wanda-Zhonghe-Shulin line in 2028.

Station overview
This two-level, underground station has an island platform. It is located beneath Zhongzheng Rd. near Losheng Sanatorium, adjoining the Xinzhuang Depot.

Construction
Excavation depth for this station is around 17 meters. It is 260 meters in length and 19.55 meters wide. The platform is 251.5 meters long. It has three entrances, one accessibility elevator, and four vent shafts. It will also have one emergency exit.

Station layout

Around the station	
Losheng Sanatorium	
Danfeng Senior High School	
Danfeng Elementary School	
Huilong Junior High & Elementary School	
Lunghwa University of Science and Technology	
Taipei Metro Xinzhuang Depot

References

Zhonghe–Xinlu line stations
Railway stations opened in 2013